Jarkko Varvio (April 28, 1972) is a Finnish former ice hockey player who had a very brief stint in the NHL.  Varvio was drafted by Minnesota North Stars in the 1992 NHL Entry Draft. He was the top scorer at the 1992 Men's World Ice Hockey Championships in Czechoslovakia. However, his only two active seasons in the NHL were in 1993-94 and 1994-95 with the Dallas Stars.  In 13 career games, he notched three goals, four assists (for seven points), and had four penalty minutes. Jarkko scored his first NHL goal in his first NHL game, which was also the first game Dallas Stars played as the Stars since leaving Minnesota. After his time with the Stars Varvio bounced around Europe playing in various leagues. Varvio last played for Ravensburg EV in Germany's GerObL before retiring in 2005.

Career statistics

Regular season and playoffs

International

References

External links 

Living people
1972 births
Ice hockey people from Tampere
Dallas Stars players
Finnish ice hockey right wingers
HPK players
Ilves players
Kalamazoo Wings (1974–2000) players
Minnesota North Stars draft picks
SC Rapperswil-Jona Lakers players
Finnish expatriate ice hockey players in Germany
Finnish expatriate ice hockey players in Switzerland
Finnish expatriate ice hockey players in the United States